Roffa is a 2013 Dutch independent drama film about football hooliganism. It was directed by Bobby Boermans and stars Loek Peters, Ilse Heus and Joost Koning. In the film, a former hooligan and member of Feyenoord football firm U.D.F. is released from prison and while trying to get his personal life back on track with his family, is pulled back into the violent activities of his firm.

Throughout the film, Feyenoord's U.D.F, fight other "firms" such as A.F.C.A, Vak G, Bunnikside, Ben-Side and Spangenaren.

Plot
Ricardo Tuinfoord (Loek Peters) grew up as a supporter of his local football club Feyenoord on the south-side of Rotterdam. After three years in prison for violent crimes he returns to his family. His wife, his teenage Son who is following in his fathers footsteps within the firm, and his mentally challenged daughter. Drugs, alcohol and pressure from his mates force Ricardo to choose between a peaceful family life while forsaking his hard earned reputation, or returning down the road of drugs, crime and violence.

Cast
 Loek Peters - Ricardo
  - Sjef
  - Patries
  - Koji
 Annique van Helvoirt - Kelly
  - Gerrit
 Wendell Jaspers as Petra
 Ben Abelsma as Hans Zuijleveld
 Jorghino Girbaran as Kevin
 Helen Hedy as Tini
 Glen Faria as Sparta supporter #1
 Julliard Frans as Sparta supporter #2
 Coosje Smid as KFC employee
 Donatella Civile as ballerina 
 Burt Rutteman as parking lot tenant

Cultural context
The name of the film is "Roffa" a nickname for the Dutch city Rotterdam, the port city famous for its docks, which is often referred to as Roffa in reference to the often rough edge of the city, which stems from its history and culture of blue collar dock workers.

See also

Hooliganism
Het Legioen

References

External links

2013 films
Dutch crime drama films
Dutch sports films
Films set in Rotterdam
Films set in the Netherlands
2013 crime drama films
Films about drugs
Dutch association football films
Feyenoord
2010s Dutch-language films
Hooliganism
Association football hooliganism